Zoltán Perl (born June 28, 1995) is a Hungarian professional basketball player for Falco Szombathely of the Nemzeti Bajnokság I/A.

Professional career
In June 2015, Perl signed a 2-year contract with Betaland Capo d'Orlando of the Italian top tier LBA. In the 2016–17 season, Perl averaged 4.5 points per game in 14.8 minutes per game. In February 2017, Perl transferred to Universo Treviso Basket of the Serie A2.

In June 2018, Perl signed with Movistar Estudiantes of the Spanish Liga ACB.

On January 18, 2019, he has signed with his old club Falco Szombathely of the Nemzeti Bajnokság I/A.  He signed a three-year extension with the team on May 11, 2020.

References

1995 births
Living people
CB Estudiantes players
Falco KC Szombathely players
Guards (basketball)
Hungarian expatriate basketball people in Italy
Hungarian expatriate basketball people in Spain
Hungarian men's basketball players
Liga ACB players
Orlandina Basket players
Pallacanestro Treviso players
Sportspeople from Szombathely
Universo Treviso Basket players